West Mersea is a town and electoral ward in  Essex, England. It is the larger (in terms of population) of two settlements on Mersea Island, south of Colchester.

History
Roman buildings and tesselated pavements close to the quayside have led to suggestions that a small Roman settlement and port existed on the site of the modern town, with a road linking it to the nearby town of Camulodunum (modern Colchester). The nearby burial mound to the north of the town is also Roman.

Edward the Confessor granted the island to the abbey of St. Ouen in Rouen, France, in 1046, and the Priory of West Mersea was established.

In 1963, the lifeboat station was established next to the West Mersea Yacht Club, one of the first ten inshore lifeboat stations in the British Isles. Originally served by a D class lifeboat, this was replaced by a B class, Atlantic 21, lifeboat in 1972. In 1992, a new boathouse and slipway were opened by the Duke of Kent. In 2001, a B class Atlantic 75 lifeboat was stationed at West Mersea, and then in 2015 this was replaced with the current B class Atlantic 85 named Just George, funded by £210,000 of community donations.

West Mersea today 
The town is served by a community centre, various shops, restaurants, small hotels, public houses, a petrol station, bank, library, museum, and several churches, including the Norman St Peter and St Paul (Church of England), Roman Catholic, Methodist, and West Mersea Free Church, affiliated to the Baptist Union.

West Mersea has a high proportion of very old people and many of the town's amenities cater for them.

As well as West Mersea Yacht Club, it also has an RNLI lifeboat station. The town hosts an annual regatta, usually in August, known as Mersea Week.

References

External links

 West Mersea Town Council official website
 The Priory of West Mersea
 Mersea Museum
 West Mersea Lifeboat Station

 
Towns in Essex
Civil parishes in Essex
Beaches of Essex
Mersea Island
Populated coastal places in Essex